Antiques Roadshow is a British television series produced by the BBC since 1979.  Series 30 (2007/08) comprised 27 editions that were broadcast by the BBC from 2 September 2007 – 30 March 2008

The dates in brackets given below are the dates each episode was filmed at the location. The date not in brackets is the episode's first UK airing date on BBC One.

Series 30 (2007/08)
The Courtyard Centre for the Arts, Hereford – 2 September 2007 (24 May 2007)
Arundel Castle, West Sussex, England – 9 September 2007 (£2006)
Alnwick Castle, Northumberland – 16 September (10 July 2007)
Burleigh Pottery, Middleport, Stoke-on-Trent, Staffordshire – 23 September (27 May 2007)
Wills Memorial Building, Bristol – 30 September
Coventry Cathedral, Coventry – 7 October (21 June 2007)
Banqueting House Part 1, London – 14 October
Banqueting House Part 2, London – 21 October
Highcliffe Castle, near Christchurch, Dorset – 28 October (14 June 2007)
Compilation (unseen items from recent episodes) – 4 November
East Kirkby Aviation Centre Part 1, Lincolnshire Thursday – 11 November (2 August 2007)
East Kirkby Aviation Centre Part 2, Lincolnshire Thursday – 18 November (2 August 2007)
Exmouth Pavilion, Exmouth, Devon – 25 November (27 September 2007)
Powis Castle, near Welshpool, Powys, Wales – 2 December 2007 (6 June 2007)
Rochester Cathedral Part 1, Rochester, Kent – 16 December 2007
Rochester Cathedral Part 2, Rochester, Kent – 23 December 2007
De La Warr Pavilion Part 1, Bexhill-on-Sea, East Sussex – 30 December 2007 (21 July 2007)
Castle of Mey, near Thurso, Scotland – 6 January 2008 (7 July 2007)
St. George's Hall, Liverpool Part 1–13 January 2008 (4 November 2007)
St. George's Hall, Liverpool Part 2–20 January 2008 (4 November 2007)
Kentwell Hall, Long Melford, Suffolk – 27 January 2008 (13 September 2007)
De Montfort Hall, Leicester – 3 February 2008 (6 September 2007)
Coronation Hall, Ulverston, Cumbria – 10 February 2008 (11 October 2007)
De La Warr Pavilion Part 2, Bexhill-on-Sea, East Sussex – 17 February 2008 (21 July 2007)
Sheffield City Hall, South Yorkshire – 2 March 2008
Special: Sport Relief, Lord's Cricket Ground, London – 16 March 2008
Special: Farewell to Michael Aspel – 30 March 2008

References

External links
 Official Website – BBC Antiques Roadshow
 Homes and Antiques, Meet the Experts
 BBC Proposed Episode Filming Locations
 Episode list – TV.com
 Episode list (from series 17) – bbcprograms.com
 Filming Dates – BBC Homes and Antiques
 BBC Restoration Roadshow

30